Eastside High School is a public secondary school in Covington, Georgia, United States. It is part of the Newton County School System. It was opened in 1994 as a transitional school and became an official high school in 1998 when it had its first graduating class.

History 
Eastside Transitional School was built in 1994 to alleviate school overcrowding at Newton High School due to the rapid growth of Newton County in the early 1990s. The school opened that same year to grades 6–9.

Each year, the lower grade was dropped and a higher grade was added, until 1997 when the school became a 9–12 high school, Eastside High.

The first graduating class graduated in May 1998.

In 2002, a new addition was built onto the school to help accommodate more growth.

In 2006, the school had an enrollment of 1,441 and a staff of 100 teachers. This number has gone down slightly with the opening of Newton County's third high school, Alcovy High School, in fall 2006.

It was announced in March 2019 that Eastside would be moving to a new location that would open at the beginning of the 2021-2022 school year. Due to construction delays because of the COVID-19 pandemic, Eastside instead moved into their new location at the beginning of the 2022-2023 school year, and the Newton County Theme School moved into the former Eastside building at the beginning of the 2023-2024 school year.

Curriculum 
Eastside High School is accredited by the Southern Association of Colleges and Schools to award College Preparatory and Technology Preparatory diplomas to graduates.

The school offers different levels of classes including: 
Advanced Placement
Gifted (Quest)
Advanced
Average

Extracurriculars 

Quiz Bowl
Naturalist Club
Key Club
FFA
FCA
4-H
DECA
Junior Classical League
Image Club
Curamus
Interact
Future Business Leaders of America
Drama Club
Junior Service Guild
Student Council
Concert Band
Marching Band
Symphonic Band
Chorus
Show Choir
Technology Student Association

Sports 
Eastside High School competes in Region 8-AAAAA in the following sports:

Baseball
Softball
Football
Soccer
Tennis
Volleyball
Cheerleading
Track and field
Wrestling
Cross country running
Swimming
Golf
Basketball
Equestrian team

Notable alumni
Eric Stokes- professional football player for the Green Bay Packers
Sheldon Rankins- professional football player for the New York Jets

Eastside media 

 WEHS Morning Show (CCTV)
 Wingspan (newspaper)
 Talon (yearbook)

References

External links 
 

Public high schools in Georgia (U.S. state)
Educational institutions established in 1994
Schools in Newton County, Georgia
1994 establishments in Georgia (U.S. state)